The Arthurian League is an English association football league for teams consisting of old boys of public schools. It is affiliated to the Amateur Football Alliance and is not part of the English football league system.

The league has existed since 1961 and currently has seven divisions.  There are currently 57 teams representing 36 separate clubs.

Member clubs 2019-20

Premier Division
Kings College Wimbledon
Old Alleynians AFC
Old Bradfieldians
Old Carthusians
Old Chigwellians
Old Etonians
Old Foresters
Old Harrovians
Old Salopians
Old Tonbridgians

Division One
Lancing Old Boys
Old Berkhamstedians
Old Brentwoods
Old Cholmeleians
Old Malvernians
Old Marlburians
Old Radleians
Old Reptonians
Old Westminsters
Old Wykehamists

Division Two
Old Aldenhamians
Old Carthusians II
Old Chigwellians II
Old Etonians II
Old Foresters II
Old Harrovians II
Old Merchant Taylors
Old Rugbeians
Old Sennockians

Division Three
Kings College Wimbledon II
Lancing Old Boys II
Old Carthusians III
Old Columbans
Old Epsomians
Old Johnians FC
Old Suttonians SV
Old Tonbridgians II
Old Wellingtonians

Division Four
Old Alleynians AFC II
Old Bancroftians AFC
Old Brentwoods II
Old Harrovians III
Old Kimboltonians
Old King's Scholars
Old Salopians II
Old Shirburnians
Old Stoics

Division Five North
Old Albanians SA
Old Brentwoods III
Old Cholmeleians II
Old Haberdashers
Old Merchant Taylors II

Division Five South
Old Alleynians AFC III
Old Amplefordians
Old Berkhamstedians II
Old Eastbournians
Old Kingstonians KGS
Old Westminsters II
Old Wykehamists II

Past champions

Premier Division
The league's top division was known as the Senior Division until 1975, and Division One up 1981.

External links
Official website

Football leagues in England
Private schools in England
Amateur association football
Sports leagues established in 1961